Akole Vidhan Sabha seat is one of the seats in Maharashtra Legislative Assembly in India. It is a segment of Shirdi lok Sabha seat. Both Akole assembly and Shirdi parliamentary seats came into existence after constituency map of India was redrawn in 2008.

Overview
Akole (constituency number 216) is one of the twelve Vidhan Sabha constituencies located in the Ahmednagar district. It comprises part of Sangamner tehsil and the entire Akole tehsil of the district.

Akole is part of the Shirdi Lok Sabha constituency along with five other Vidhan Sabha segments in this district, namely Sangamner, Shirdi, Kopargaon, Shrirampur and Nevasa. It is reserved for the candidates belonging to the Scheduled tribes.

Members of Vidhan Sabha
 Until 2008 : Seat did not exist
 2009 : Madhukar Pichad, (NCP) 
 2014 : Vaibhav Pichad, (NCP) 
 2019 : Kiran Lahamate, (NCP)

Election Results

2019

2009 
 Pichad Madhukar Kashinath (NCP) : 60,043 votes    
 Talpade Madhukar Shankar (SHS) : 50,964

See also 
 Akole
 List of constituencies of Maharashtra Legislative Assembly

References 

Assembly constituencies of Maharashtra
2008 establishments in Maharashtra
Constituencies established in 2008